Alei Zahav (lit. Golden Leaves) is an Israeli settlement organized as a community settlement located on the western edge of the northern West Bank, adjacent to the Palestinian towns of Deir Ballut and Kafr ad-Dik, whose lands were confiscated for building Alei Zahav. The settlement, under the administrative municipal government of the Shomron Regional Council, is adjacent to Peduel and Beit Aryeh.

Israeli outposts are unauthorized in Israeli law, while Israeli settlements are considered illegal under international law, but the Israeli government disputes this.

History
Founded in 1983 on Israeli state lands by non-Orthodox Jewish Israelis from the Beitar and Herut movements, the settlement is now home to about 120 families. The town is named after Aliza Begin, the wife of former Israeli prime minister Menachem Begin. The original name of the town had been Yoezer.

It is now expanding into a settlement called Leshem.

Alei Zahav is founded on land which Israel confiscated  from the Palestinian towns of Deir Ballut and Kafr ad-Dik.

References

External links
Photo gallery at the Shomron Regional Council

Israeli settlements in the West Bank
1983 establishments in the Palestinian territories
Populated places established in 1983